Claydon with Clattercot is a civil parish in Oxfordshire, England. It was formed in 1932 by merger of the parish of Claydon with the extra-parochial area of Clattercote. As at the United Kingdom Census 2011 its population was 306 and it had a total of 6.22 km² of land, water and roads.

Sources

External links
Claydon village website

References

Civil parishes in Oxfordshire